The Jerusalem Subdistrict was one of the subdistricts of Mandatory Palestine. It was located in and around the city of Jerusalem. After the 1948 Arab–Israeli War, on the Israeli side of the Green Line, the district was integrated into the Jerusalem District. On the other side, the West Bank was annexed into Jordan, the subdistrict was merged with Ramallah Subdistrict to form Jerusalem Governorate, one of three Jordanian governorates in the West Bank.

Depopulated towns and villages

Allar
Aqqur
Artuf
Bayt 'Itab
Bayt Mahsir
Bayt Naqquba
Bayt Thul
Bayt Umm al-Mays
al-Burayj
Dayr Aban
Dayr 'Amr
Dayr al-Hawa
Dayr Rafat

Dayr al-Shaykh
Deir Yassin
Ayn Karim
Ishwa
Islin
Khirbat Ism Allah
Jarash
al-Jura
Kasla
Khirbat Al-Lawz
Lifta
al-Maliha
Nitaf

al-Qabu
Qalunya
al-Qastal
Ras Abu 'Ammar
Romema
Sar'a
Saris
Sataf
Suba
Sheikh Badr
Sufla
Khirbat al-Tannur
Khirbat al-'Umur
al-Walaja

References

 01
Subdistricts of Mandatory Palestine